Lodovico Magio (1564–1618) was a Roman Catholic prelate who served as Bishop of Lucera (1609–1618).

Biography
Lodovico Magio was born in Milan, Italy in 1564 and ordained a priest in 1599.

On 29 April 1609, he was appointed Bishop of Lucera by Pope Paul V (Borghese). On 10 May 1609, he was consecrated bishop by Giovanni Garzia Mellini, Bishop of Imola, with Galeazzo Sanvitale, Archbishop Emeritus of Bari-Canosa, and Ulpiano Volpi, Archbishop of Chieti, serving as co-consecrators.

He served as  Bishop of Lucera until his death in 1618.

References

External links and additional sources
 (for Chronology of Bishops)  
 (for Chronology of Bishops)  

17th-century Italian Roman Catholic bishops
Bishops appointed by Pope Paul V
1564 births
1618 deaths